Collier Bay is a bay in the Indian Ocean, located on the Kimberley coast in the north-west of Western Australia.

It is bounded by the Yampi Peninsula to the south, the Montgomery Reef and Koolan Island at its western extent, with Camden Sound Marine Park beyond.  
The Kingfisher Islands, Traverse Island, Fletcher Island, and a number of other small islands lie within the bay. Fresh water flows into the bay via Secure Bay, as well as the Walcott Inlet, which brings water from the Charnley, Calder and Isdell Rivers into the bay via Yule Entrance.

See also
Charnley River–Artesian Range Wildlife Sanctuary

References

Further reading

Bays of the Indian Ocean
Kimberley coastline of Western Australia